William Snoddy (born December 6, 1957) is a former sprinter from the United States. He achieved most success in the 200-meter dash where he was NCAA champion in 1977.

In 1978, Snoddy ran the 100-meter dash in a heavily wind-assisted time of 9.87 seconds – then the fastest time ever recorded for a 100 m race. The wind speed was recorded at 25 mph.

Track career 

Snoddy was a star sprinter at Nathan Hale High School setting a state age record in the 220 y dash of 21.0 s, and won two state championships at the distance in consecutive years, 1975 and 1976.
Snoddy attended the University of Oklahoma.
As a college freshman, Snoddy became NCAA champion (US collegiate champion) in 1977 over 200 m. He recorded a winning time of 20.48 s, then a low-altitude meeting record, at Champaign, Illinois on June 4. The following year, as a college sophomore, he was second, recording a time of 20.28 s at the meeting in Eugene, Oregon on June 3.
On 1 April 1978, at a meet in Dallas, Texas, Snoddy ran 100 m in the wind-assisted time of 9.87 s then the fastest time ever recorded for a 100 m race.
He also won Indoor College Conference titles at 300 yards in 1977 and 1978., setting the University of Oklahoma record of 29.47 s in 1978.
Snoddy returned to run track again in the 1980s after a hiatus. He achieved some moderate success - in 1987 he won the New Year Sprint race (110 m handicap race) in Scotland.

Later life 

Snoddy left college early after two years and joined the United States Navy.

He later worked as a water supervisor for the city of Houston and in airport security for TSA, the airport-security organization.

Rankings 

Snoddy was ranked in the top ten 200 m sprinters in the world in 1977 and 1978, according to the votes of the experts of Track and Field News.

Notes

References 

Living people
1957 births
American male sprinters
Track and field athletes from Seattle
Oklahoma Sooners men's track and field athletes
Universiade medalists in athletics (track and field)
Universiade bronze medalists for the United States
Medalists at the 1977 Summer Universiade